The Bostonians is a 1984 romantic drama period film directed by James Ivory. The screenplay by Ruth Prawer Jhabvala is based on the 1886 American novel The Bostonians by Henry James. The film stars Vanessa Redgrave, Christopher Reeve, Madeleine Potter, and Jessica Tandy.

The Bostonians was released in the United States on 2 August 1984. The film received respectable reviews and nominations by the Golden Globe Awards, Academy Awards, British Academy Film Awards, and won Golden Peacock (Best Film) at the 10th International Film Festival of India.

Plot
Olive Chancellor, a Back Bay Boston spinster and leader of the women's suffrage movement, becomes enamored of Verena Tarrant, an inspirational young speaker, and adopts Verena as her protegée, her friend, and her companion. When Olive's distant relation, the chauvinist Southern lawyer Basil Ransom falls in love with Verena and wishes to marry her—to relegate the young woman to the kitchen and the nursery—Olive and Ransom find themselves competing for Verena's affections. The charismatic Miss Tarrant must then choose whether to get herself to the nunnery of Olive's social cause or submit to the sensual but subservient life promised by Ransom.

Cast
Christopher Reeve as Basil Ransom
Vanessa Redgrave as Olive Chancellor
Madeleine Potter as Verena Tarrant
Jessica Tandy as Miss Birdseye
Nancy Marchand as Mrs. Burrage
Wesley Addy as Dr. Tarrant
Barbara Bryne as Mrs. Tarrant
Linda Hunt as Dr. Prance
Charles McCaughan as Music Hall Police Officer
Nancy New as Adeline
John Van Ness Philip as Henry Burrage
Wallace Shawn as Mr. Pardon

Production

Filming
Locations where the film was shot include:
The Library of the Boston Athenaeum
Gibson House Museum
Beacon Hill, Boston
Harvard University
Chateau-sur-Mer, Newport, Rhode Island
Troy Savings Bank Music Hall
Central Park (including Belvedere Castle), New York City
Martha's Vineyard

Critical reception
Roger Ebert praised the film, giving it 3 out of 4 stars and observing:
...intelligent and subtle and open to the underlying tragedy of a woman who does not know what she wants, a man who does not care what he wants, and a girl who does not need what she wants.

On review aggregator Rotten Tomatoes, the film has an 87% approval rating based on 15 reviews, with an average rating of 6.90/10. On Metacritic, The Bostonians has a score of 59 out of a 100 based on 10 critics, indicating "mixed or average reviews".

Accolades

National Society of Film Critics Awards
Won: Best Actress – Vanessa Redgrave

Golden Globe Awards
Nominated: Best Performance by an Actress in a Motion Picture – Drama – Vanessa Redgrave

Academy Awards
Nominated: Best Actress – Vanessa Redgrave
Nominated: Best Costume Design – Jenny Beavan, John Bright

BAFTA Awards
Nominated: Best Costume Design – Jenny Beavan, John Bright

References

External links

 The Bostonians  at Merchant Ivory Productions
The Bostonians at Cohen Film Collection

1984 drama films
1984 LGBT-related films
1984 romantic drama films
British LGBT-related films
American LGBT-related films
Lesbian-related films
Films based on American novels
Films based on works by Henry James
Films set in the 1880s
Films shot in Boston
Films shot in Massachusetts
Films shot in Martha's Vineyard
Films shot in New York City
Films directed by James Ivory
Merchant Ivory Productions films
1980s English-language films
1980s American films
1980s British films